Grace Academy may refer to:

 Ark Evelyn Grace Academy, an English Academy secondary school in Brixton, London
 Grace Academy (North Carolina), a Christian University-Model school located in Matthews, North Carolina
 Grace Academy (Darlaston), an English Academy secondary school in Darlaston
 Grace Academy (Coventry), an English Academy secondary school in Coventry
 Grace Academy (Solihull), an English Academy secondary school in Solihull